Lickingville is an unincorporated community in Clarion County, Pennsylvania, United States. Lickingville had a post office until June 4, 2011; it still has its own ZIP code, 16332.

References

Unincorporated communities in Clarion County, Pennsylvania
Unincorporated communities in Pennsylvania